Frank Albert Mechau (may-show) Jr. (January 1904–1946), was an American artist and muralist. 

Mechau's aspiration to become an artist began early in his life and developed rapidly. His determination led to a distinguished career that included three Guggenheim fellowships, thirteen public mural commissions, and work featured in dozens of national and international exhibitions. Many of his paintings are currently in private collections and museums around the U.S, and his murals adorn the walls of public buildings in Colorado, Nebraska, Texas, and Washington, DC.

Early life 
Mechau's grandfather August emigrated from Mechau, Germany via New Orleans, eventually settling in Missouri. He married Helena Breuer and the couple moved to Brown County, Kansas, where they had seven children, including Mechau's father Frank Albert (b. 1874).

Mechau was born January 1904 in Wakeeney, Kansas to Frank Albert Mechau and Alice Livingston Mechau, who married in 1892. The family moved to Glenwood Springs, Colorado when Mechau was a young boy. He was one of four children of the couple. Mechau senior operated a livery yard.

Mechau studied at the University of Denver and the Art Institute of Chicago. While at the Art Institute he worked at Marshall Field's in the book department. He spent time studying in New York and in 1929 moved with his wife, Paula, to Europe to study there.

Artistic career

In 1931 five works by Mechau were exhibited in the Parc des Expositions exhibit Les Surindependents.

Having returned to the U.S., Mechau was urged but did not accept the advice of colleagues to settle in New York since it had become recognized as the world's leading art center—and therefore critically important to aspiring artists. Instead, he headed home to paint what he knew best—the people, landscapes, and horses of the country he loved, with Denver as a starting place. His European experience landed him a teaching position at the Kirkland School of Art, and he caught the attention of Denver arts enthusiasts with a lecture series he gave on contemporary French and American painting. Anne Evans, a prominent member of the Denver Artists Club, was among his new admirers, and was instrumental in Mechau landing his first mural commission through the federal government's Public Works of Art Project (PWAP) in 1934. That mural, Horses at Night, was widely praised by American art critics, and he quickly became recognized as one of the country's most promising young artists.

That remarkable success led to Mechau receiving two more Guggenheim Fellowships in 1934. He was Colorado's first recipient of the honor and one of the first to be allowed to continue working in the U.S. instead of Europe. He immersed himself in his home territory and began drawing and painting, saturating himself with ideas and subjects for his work. In 1935, he was invited to join the teaching staff at the Broadmoor Art Academy in Colorado Springs. By that time, his first son Dorik and second daughter Duna had joined the family. And it was the beginning of a remarkably productive few years for Mechau that combined teaching, the execution of five more murals for government commissions, and the completion of his one and only fresco, Wild Horses, a sixty-foot-long panel incorporated into an exterior wall of the new Colorado Springs Fine Arts Center designed by noted architect John Gaw Meem.

Three significant events took place in 1938. First, Mechau met renowned architect Frank Lloyd Wright whom he deeply admired. Wright had been invited to Colorado Springs to deliver the keynote address at a conference on The Arts in American Life. Conversations after the conference between Mechau and Wright resulted in an invitation for Mechau to visit Taliesin West, Wright's winter home and school in Arizona. Second, the Mechau family decided to move to the charming mountain village of Redstone, a stone's throw from Glenwood Springs, after a momentous visit there the previous summer (see Family section below). And finally, Mechau received his third Guggenheim Fellowship, allowing him to step away from teaching at the Colorado Springs Fine Arts Center and devote full-time to painting in his Redstone studio.

At this point Mechau faced the challenge of completing several of the largest of his commissioned murals on a short timeline. Fortunately, three of his most talented students at the Fine Arts Center—the twins Ethel and Jenny Magafan, and Eduardo Chavez—eagerly accepted Mechau's invitation to come to Redstone to assist him. These talented young people had first been drawn to Mechau because of his approach to teaching art through apprenticeships and they saw this as a rare opportunity for an extended collaboration with him. It proved to be remarkably productive—and looking back it is hard to imagine how Mechau could have met the deadlines for completing these murals without their contributions. And the rich experiences gained by his apprentices during this summer period in Redstone led to a flowering of their artistic talents, commissioned murals of their own, and widespread recognition.

Mechau visited Taliesin early in 1939. He relished the opportunities there to explore the fertile ground where the  interests of the two men coincided about philosophical and tangible dimensions of art and architecture. After returning to Redstone, he realized that the New Deal's PWA art commissions were ebbing and sensed the need to immerse himself once again in teaching. As luck would have it, he heard from a friend that Columbia University was searching for a notable artist to head up its Department of Painting and Sculpture. He applied for the position and his appointment soon followed, highlighted in his hometown newspaper, the Glenwood Post, in May1939.

Mechau taught at Columbia for close to four years. The prestigious position was not without its challenges; he found little time to devote to painting, and further had to divide his attention between work and his devotion to his family. They had moved with him to New York for the first two academic years, spending important summers in Redstone, but that arrangement proved very expensive and Mechau later returned to Columbia without them.

In the spring of 1943, at the end of the academic year, Mechau was invited to participate in a government project focused on artistic documentation of the U.S. Armed Forces' participation in World War II. He led a four-artist unit on assignment to the Caribbean and Panama. Mechau's lively journals written during the trip recount his fascination with people and places he saw and perilous adventures flying through tropical storms to move from site to site.

The twelve paintings he produced are now held in the Army Art Collection at the U.S. Army Center of Military History in Fort McNair, DC.

Upon returning to Redstone after this trip, Mechau was less inclined to return to the academic world at Columbia. In August 1943, he requested a leave of absence that ultimately became his resignation from his position there. Mechau then happily settled into life with his family in Redstone, and in the next couple of years produced some of his iconic paintings depicting people and landscapes central his life, including the iconic Tom Kenney Comes Home, Dorik and His Colt, Children's Hour, and Autumn Roundup. Deer in Moonlight, painted early in 1946 would be his last work. Mechau's untimely death from a heart attack in March of that year cut short his extraordinarily full life and distinguished artistic career.

Murals 

Between 1934 and 1940, Mechau was awarded a total of eleven mural commissions through New Deal art projects. Horses at Night was followed in 1935 by two Mechau murals that were selected for placement in the new Post Office Department Building designed to incorporate large works of art. Each of the competition winners created a pair of murals. Mechau's depicted aspects of mail delivery during years of U.S. westward expansion. Pony Express features riders and their horses at a checkpoint along the Pony Express route. 

Dangers of the Mail portrays the ambush and violent attack by Native Americans on a mail stagecoach and its occupants. Researcher Jessy Ohl describes the main painting as showing three "naked white women (being) scalped in a sexually explicit manner" in the bottom right hand of the painting, where they are shown kneeling and bent awkwardly toward the sky and ground by three Native Americans. The Washington Post in 2000 reported a critic saying of the scene, "That so much plays into the stereotype of the sexually violent savage. He's going to either rape her or scalp her or both". Art historian Karal Ann Marling describe the figures of the women as "clearly female, to be sure, thanks to volumetric mass".  The mural received widespread objections at the time for historical inaccuracy and government-funded lewdness and renewed objections in the 2000s for creating a hostile work environment for employees of the Environmental Protection Agency, which had made the building its headquarters. The Government Services Agency eventually blocked the mural from view.

In 1936 Mechau completed three new mural commissions for Post Office Buildings in Glenwood Springs and Colorado Springs, Colorado. One of them, Indian Fight, currently occupies the Denver Federal Center in Denver, CO. The Corral and Wild Horse Race can now be seen at the Byron Rogers U.S. Courthouse in Denver. Mechau's mural Longhorns, completed in 1938, occupies the Post Office Building in Ogallala, Nebraska.

Fighting a Prairie Fire, also completed in 1938, was commissioned for the post office in Brownfield, Texas—now sheltered at the Brownfield Police Station. The following historical marker has been placed in front of the building with text reading: "Fighting A Prairie Fire by Frank Mechau. Mechau, a resident of Colorado, was selected by the WPA to paint a mural for the Brownfield Post Office which he completed in October 1940. The work of Frank Mechau stands as a magnificent documentation of the West. The promising young artist died in 1946. According to the artist, 'The prairie fire was a demon of the Panhandle. Sixty square miles of range could be destroyed in a day's time. Once the flame began to spread there were few efficient ways to combat it. Plowing a line was too slow, backfiring too dangerous. Cowboys would fight the fire with wet sacks or kill a steer and partly skin it leaving the wet skin to drag behind in an effort to rub out the edge of the fire. (Terry County Historical Commission).

Mechau's last New Deal murals were three oil-on-canvas panels commissioned for the Eldon B. Mahon United States Courthouse building located in Fort Worth, Texas. The Taking of Sam Bass, Two Texas Rangers, and Flags Over Texas were the only New Deal art commissions sponsored in Fort Worth.

Personal life 
Mechau married Paula Ralska, at the time working in the advertising department of Lord & Taylor. The couple lived in Greenwich Village before moving to Europe in 1929. In 1930 they were living in Montrouge. The couple had four children.

Redstone had been created at the turn of the century by John Cleveland Osgood, president of the Colorado Fuel and Iron Corporation, but operations there were shut down abruptly in 1910, leaving the village virtually deserted. The couple decided to purchase a home there.

References

1904 births
1946 deaths
American muralists
Painters from Colorado
20th-century American painters
American male painters
Section of Painting and Sculpture artists
University of Denver alumni
School of the Art Institute of Chicago alumni
People from WaKeeney, Kansas
Artists from Kansas
20th-century American male artists
Public Works of Art Project artists